Layers are used in digital image editing to separate different elements of an image. A layer can be compared to a transparency on which imaging effects or images are applied and placed over or under an image. Today they are an integral feature of image editor.

Layers were first commercially available in Fauve Matisse (later Macromedia xRes),
and then available in Adobe Photoshop 3.0, in 1994, but today a wide range of other programs, such as Photo-Paint, Paint Shop Pro, GIMP, Paint.NET, StylePix, and even batch processing tools also include this feature. In vector image editors that support animation, layers are used to further enable manipulation along a common timeline for the animation; in SVG images, the equivalent to layers are "groups".

Layer types
There are different kinds of layers, and not all of them exist in all programs. They represent a part of a picture, either as pixels or as modification instructions. They are stacked on top of each other, and depending on the order, determine the appearance of the final picture.

In graphics software, layers are the different levels at which one can place an object or image file. In the program, layers can be stacked, merged, or defined when creating a digital image. Layers can be partially obscured allowing portions of images within a layer to be hidden or shown in a translucent manner within another image. Layers can also be used to combine two or more images into a single digital image. For the purpose of editing, working with layers allows for applying changes to just one specific layer.

Layer (basic)

The standard layer available to most programs consists of a rectangular, semitransparent picture which may be superimposed over other layers. Some programs require that layers cover the same area as the final canvas, but others offer layers of multiple sizes.

Each layer may bear individual settings, such as opacity, blending modes, dynamic filters, and potentially hundreds of other properties.

Layer mask

A layer mask is linked to a layer and hides part of the layer from the picture. What is painted black on the layer mask will not be visible in the final picture. What is grey will be more or less transparent depending on the shade of grey. As the layer mask can be both edited and moved around independently of both the background layer and the layer it applies to, it gives the user the ability to test a lot of different combinations of overlay.

Adjustment layer

An adjustment layer typically applies a common effect like brightness or saturation to other layers. However, as the effect is stored in a separate layer, it is easy to try it out and switch between different alternatives, without changing the original layer. In addition, an adjustment layer can easily be edited, just like a layer mask, so an effect can be applied to just part of the image.

See also
Alpha compositing
Comparison of raster graphics editors
Digital image editing
Raster graphics
Image processing
Sprite (computer graphics)

References 

Digital photography
Image processing